Ernest George Jansen (7 August 1881 – 25 November 1959) was the second to last Governor-General of the Union of South Africa, holding office from 1951 until his death in 1959.

Early life and education
Born on 7 August 1881, he graduated with a law degree from the University of the Cape of Good Hope in 1905, and was admitted as an advocate (the South African equivalent of a barrister) in 1913.

Political career
An ardent champion of Afrikaner interests, he joined the National Party in 1915 and was a member of Parliament from 1915 to 1920, from 1921 to 1943, and from 1947 to 1950.

In 1919, he was a member of a delegation which tried unsuccessfully to persuade American president Woodrow Wilson to call for independence to be restored to the former Boer republics of the Orange Free State and the Transvaal.

In Parliament, Jansen was Speaker of the House of Assembly of South Africa from 1924 to 1929, Minister of Native Affairs and of Irrigation from 1929 to 1934, and Speaker again from 1934 to 1943.  He was highly regarded for his firm and impartial speakership.

He was Minister of Native Affairs again from 1948 to 1950, but was thought to be too soft on the new policy of apartheid, for which his department was primarily responsible. He was subsequently replaced by hardliner Hendrik Verwoerd and formally promoted by Prime Minister Daniel Malan to the politically neutral post of Governor-General once vacant. As an Afrikaner nationalist and stout republican, Jansen declined to wear the ceremonial uniform, or to take the oath of allegiance to the monarch whom he represented.  He held office until his death in 1959, when he was succeeded by Minister of Justice Charles Robberts Swart.

Personal life and legacy
Jansen married Martha Mabel Pellissier in 1912.  Both were prominent figures in Afrikaner cultural circles.  Jansen was a founder member of the South African Academy for Science and Art (Suid-Afrikaanse Akademie vir Wetenskap en Kuns - SAAWEK) in 1909, of the Co-operation Union (Saamwerk-Unie) in 1917, of the Federation of Afrikaner Cultural Associations (Federasie van Afrikaanse Kultuurvereniginge - FAK) in 1929, and of the Voortrekkers (the Afrikaner equivalent of the Boy Scouts and Girl Guides) in 1930, and was master of ceremonies at the laying of the foundation stone of the Voortrekker Monument in 1938 and at its dedication in 1949.

Hoërskool Dr. E.G. Jansen (High School), in Boksburg, is named after him.

See also

 Afrikaner
 Afrikaner Calvinism
 Afrikaner nationalism

References

Dictionary of South African Biography Volume V

1881 births
1959 deaths
Afrikaner people
Colony of Natal people
Governors-General of South Africa
Government ministers of South Africa
Members of the Dutch Reformed Church in South Africa (NGK)
National Party (South Africa) politicians
People from Dundee, KwaZulu-Natal
Speakers of the House of Assembly (South Africa)
South African people of German descent
University of South Africa alumni
Migrants from the Colony of Natal to Cape Colony